Kumaresan a/l Aramugam is a Malaysian politician from PKR. He has been the Member of Penang State Legislative Assembly for Batu Uban since 2018.

Education 
He is from Batu Gajah, Perak. He studied in SMK Sultan Yussuf and got his Bachelor of Management degree from Universiti Sains Malaysia. 
When he was studying in USM, he was active in campus activities and was the Director of  Publicity of USM Indian Cultural Association. He was also an intern staff in the office of Sim Tze Tzin, Member of Parliament for Bayan Baru.

Participation in NGO 
He was given the role of coordinator of PKR Citizenship Program in Penang. Together with N. Surendran, a humanitarian lawyer, he had established a task force to help stateless people and children to get their citizenship and to get to school in Penang. He was the Chairman of Malaysia Indian Youth Council and the Chairman of Hindu Youth Organisation Bayan Baru.

Politics 
He was a member of Penang Island City Council for four terms from 2014 to 2018 and was the youngest member of PKR. He is currently the Vice President of PKR Penang State Leadership Council and Chief of AMK of Bayan Baru branch. He was the Secretary of PKR Bayan Baru branch from 2013 to 2018 and Member of Executive council of National AMK from 2014 to 2018.

Election result

References 

People from Perak
Universiti Sains Malaysia alumni
People's Justice Party (Malaysia) politicians
Members of the Penang State Legislative Assembly
Malaysian people of Indian descent
Malaysian politicians of Indian descent
Living people
Year of birth missing (living people)